The North Fork Ninnescah River is a river in the central Great Plains of North America. Its entire length lies within the U.S. state of Kansas. It is a tributary of the Ninnescah River.

Geography
The North Fork Ninnescah River originates in south-central Kansas in the Arkansas River Lowlands. From there, it flows generally northeast before turning to the southeast near Plevna, Kansas. It then flows across a far eastern portion of the High Plains into Cheney Reservoir in the Wellington Lowlands. From the reservoir's dam, the river continues southeast to its confluence with the South Fork Ninnescah River in southwestern Sedgwick County to form the Ninnescah River.

History
In 1965, the U.S. Bureau of Reclamation completed a dam on the river north of Cheney, Kansas for flood control and municipal water supply, creating Cheney Reservoir.

See also
List of rivers of Kansas

References

Rivers of Kansas